Their Big Moment is a 1934 American mystery film directed by James Cruze, from a screenplay by Arthur Caesar and Marion Dix.  The film starred ZaSu Pitts and Slim Summerville. It is based on the 1933 West End play Afterwards by Walter C. Hackett which had run for more than two hundred performances in London. While most of the Pitts-Summerville teamings were comedies, this was a serious drama in which they merely played comic-relief characters; their star billing was thus misleading.

Plot
Tillie Whim (ZaSu Pitts), a timid stage assistant to The Great La Salle (William Gaxton) in a small mentalist act playing a Vaudeville theater, is harassed, bullied, and undermined by the act's co-star, primadonna Lottie (Tamara Geva). When Lottie finally attempts to fire Tillie after a performance, La Salle fires Lottie instead.

The remaining troupe are then hired backstage by an audience member (Bruce Cabot) to debunk another mentalist, whom he accuses of exploiting his friend, a grief-stricken woman who has recently lost her husband in a plane crash.  Tillie is promoted to Lottie's old role as medium, but unexpectedly deviates from the script when the spirit of the departed tells her that the plane crash was murder.

Cast
 Zasu Pitts as Tillie Whim
 Slim Summerville as Bill Ambrose
 William Gaxton as The Great La Salle
 Bruce Cabot as Lane Franklyn
 Kay Johnson as Eve Farrington
 Julie Haydon as Fay Harley
 Ralph Morgan as Dr. Portman
 Huntley Gordon as John Farrington
 Tamara Geva as Lottie

References

External links
 
 
 
 

Films produced by Cliff Reid
Films directed by James Cruze
RKO Pictures films
American films based on plays
1934 mystery films
American black-and-white films
American mystery films
1930s English-language films
1930s American films